Tonia Williams (born 1966) is a New Zealand-British retired rower. She is the 1993 World Rowing Champion in the lightweight women's four, she won the title with Jane Hall, Alison Brownless and Annamarie Phelps.

References

1966 births
Living people
New Zealand emigrants to the United Kingdom
New Zealand female rowers
British female rowers
World Rowing Championships medalists for Great Britain
Rowers from Auckland
New Zealand expatriate sportspeople in England